The girls' singles tournament of the 2010 US Open started on Sunday September 5, the seventh day of the main tournament.

Heather Watson was the defending champion, but was no longer eligible to compete as a junior that year.

Daria Gavrilova won this event, after beating her compatriot Yulia Putintseva in the final, 6–3, 6–2.

Seeds

Draw

Finals

Top half

Section 1

Section 2

Bottom half

Section 3

Section 4

External links 
 Main draw
 Qualifying draw

Girls Singles
US Open, 2010 Girls' Singles